Clitocybe agrestis is a species of agaric fungus in the family Tricholomataceae. Widely distributed in Europe (agrestis means "of fields") it was described as new to science in 1969 by Finnish mycologist Harri Harmaja. Fruitbodies are poisonous as they contain the toxin muscarine.

References

External links

agrestis
Fungi described in 1969
Fungi of Europe
Poisonous fungi